Welland Goldsmith School (WGS) is a  primary, secondary and senior secondary school in Kolkata, West Bengal. WGS has two branches, one at Bowbazar and the other at Patuli. The Bowbazar branch was established in 1869 and the patuli branch in 2004. The Bowbazar branch is a Girls school while the Patuli branch is a co-educational school. Both of the schools are affiliated to the Council for the Indian School Certificate Examinations, New Delhi with I.C.S.E. at the class X level and I.S.C. at the class XII level comprising three streams viz. Science, Commerce, Humanities.

History

Reverend Joseph Welland, M.A.of Trinity Dublin was responsible for starting the Old Church Day School in 1876. H. The School moved into its premises in 1884.

In the year 1890, Reverend Herbert Gouldsmith M.A. Oxford took over the responsibility of the Old Mission Church. In November 1891 he began the Free Day School in addition to the Welland School for paying students.

In the year 1900, the school settled into its new quarters at 288 Bepin Behari Ganguly Street.

In 1936, the Welland School was combined with the Gouldsmith Free School to be called the Welland Gouldsmith School.

References

Primary schools in West Bengal
High schools and secondary schools in West Bengal
Schools in Kolkata
1869 establishments in British India
Educational institutions established in 1869